My Lady's Manor is a national historic district at Monkton, Baltimore County and Jarrettsville, Harford County, Maryland, United States.  It is a rural or agricultural area, with one village, Monkton. Monkton first developed around a water-powered grist mill and later became a station on the Northern Central Railway. The  manor itself was established in 1713. Over 60 principal structures, plus numerous important outbuildings associated with them, are included in the district.

It was added to the National Register of Historic Places in 1978.

Thomas Brerewood

Thomas Brerewood (c.1670 - 22 December 1746), was an 'English Gentleman and Entrepreneur. He was also a 'fraudster' on an epic scale. The son of Thomas Brerewood (senior) of Horton, Cheshire, England. Thomas came from a wealthy and very prominent Chester family; the son of an Anglican rector and the grandson of Sir Robert Brerewood, a justice of the Court of Common Pleas during the English Civil War (1642–51). He also had a well-known professor, a mayor of Chester, and a clerk of the House of Commons in his family tree.

By 1705, when he was in his mid-thirties, Brerewood was already a man of considerable personal fortune, when he was involved in what was known as the Pitkin Affair in 1705  It was a financial scandal that rocked England. Unravelling the scam required three large insolvencies (including his bankers Coggs & Dann) and four acts of Parliament over the course of more than forty years. However, Brerewood's ability to negotiate successfully with his creditors, resulted in his Pardon, and he was fully discharged by 1709. He was thus permitted to rebuild his fortunes. This he seems to have done.

The opportunity came about offering him a new career in the Colonies. In September 1716, his son Thomas Jr., then in his early twenties, married Charlotte Calvert, the fourteen-year-old daughter of the fourth Lord Baltimore Benedict Calvert, 4th Baron Baltimore. The marriage may not have been sanctioned by her family, for the couple had a clandestine wedding  in the Fleet Prison, (Fleet Marriage) which was not publicly announced until February of the following year. In July 1731, Charlotte inherited 10,000 acres in northern Maryland called My Lady's Manor. The following month, Charlotte and her husband deeded the land to Brerewood with the intent that he would use the property to pay off Thomas Jr.’s creditors, of whom Brerewood was likely the largest.

In order to better organize the property, Brerewood, by then in his early sixties, went to Maryland, where he would spend the rest of his life. He is believed to have been an innovative and successful land manager, dividing the property into lots, obtaining tenants, (whom he insisted pay their debts), and founding a short-lived town called Charlotte Town on the site of the present Monkton, Maryland. Completing his resurrection as a man of importance, in 1741, Brerewood became clerk of Baltimore County, a well-remunerated position he held until his death on December 22, 1746.

References

External links

, including undated photo, at Maryland Historical Trust

Historic districts in Baltimore County, Maryland
Historic districts in Harford County, Maryland
Historic districts on the National Register of Historic Places in Maryland
National Register of Historic Places in Harford County, Maryland
National Register of Historic Places in Baltimore County, Maryland
1713 establishments in Maryland